John Edward Evans (April 1868 – 1942), also known as "Jammer", was an English footballer who played in the Football League for Bury, Burslem Port Vale and Stoke.

Career
Evans played for Newcastle Swifts before joining local league club Stoke in 1891. He had a decent debut season with Stoke scoring six goals during the 1891–92 season. Evans became the first Stoke player to be sent-off, after receiving his marching orders in an away match at Everton on 12 November 1892. He recovered well from this set back and went on to score 10 league goals during the 1892–93 season, helping Stoke to achieve their highest league position to that point of 7th. He spent two more seasons at the Victoria Ground, but failed to hold down a place in the starting eleven.

He left in 1895 for Bury, and then moved on to Burslem Port Vale, most likely in the autumn of 1896. He was a regular in the first team, helping the side win the Staffordshire Senior Cup in 1898. However he lost his place at the start of the 1898–99 season, after the club were promoted back to the Football League from the Midland League, and he was released upon its conclusion.

Career statistics
Source:

Honours
Port Vale
Staffordshire Senior Cup: 1898

References

1868 births
1942 deaths
People from Fenton, Staffordshire
Footballers from Stoke-on-Trent
English footballers
Association football forwards
Stoke City F.C. players
Bury F.C. players
Port Vale F.C. players
Midland Football League players
English Football League players